Louis Garneau (born August 9, 1958 in Sainte-Foy, Quebec, Canada) is a retired competitive cyclist, artist, and businessman of French-Canadian descent.

In 1978, Garneau was the Canadian champion in individual pursuit cycling. In 1983, he founded Louis Garneau Sports, which sells cycling clothing and accessories.

Early years 
Garneau was born in Sainte-Foy, Quebec on August 9, 1958, the son of Paul Garneau and Jeannine Lehoux. He obtained his bachelor's degree in visual arts from Laval University and won an excellence scholarship there in 1983.

From 1970 to 1983, Garneau was an international cyclist and won the title of Canadian champion in individual pursuit in 1978. He was selected to participate in the 1980 Moscow Olympics, but could not participate due to the boycott of these games by Canada. After taking part in the 1984 Los Angeles Olympics, he retired from competition.

Business career 
In 1983, Garneau began making clothing for cyclists in his father's garage, supported in this project by his wife, Monique Arsenault. The company became Louis Garneau Clothing. In 1984, the company moved to larger premises (140 square meters or 1,500 square feet), then was forced to expand again in 1985, to premises of 464 square meters (5,000 square feet).

In 1988, when the company reached 118 employees, it moved to a building of 2972 square meters (32,000 square feet) in St-Augustin-de-Desmaures. The building was enlarged in 1993 and 1999, with the creation of a distribution center.

Louis Garneau decided to launch an assault on the American market in 1989, with the opening of the Louis Garneau USA plant in Newport, Vermont in 1989. This new division initially employed 12 people. The area of the American building will be doubled in 1999.

The Newport, Vermont building no longer sufficient for the company's needs, a major investment will materialize on August 15, 2014 with the inauguration of a new state-of-the-art building in Derby, Vermont, which includes a distribution center for the American market.

In 2015, the Louis Garneau Sports Inc. employs around 450 people and exports to more than 50 countries. Louis Garneau Sports, which celebrated its 30th anniversary of founding in 2013, holds numerous patents, mainly with the Canadian Intellectual Property Office (CIPO) and the United States Patent and Trademark Office (USPTO), in order to protect its many innovations.

Since 2018, the Garneau Group includes the Canadian trilogy of three brands: Garneau, Sugoi and Sombrio. Their products, intended for cyclists, triathletes, as well as several disciplines of winter sports such as snowshoeing, are sold in more than 40 countries, starting with Canada and the United States.

In March 2020, the company filed for creditor protection, but announced its intention to take the company public in 2023 thanks to e-bike market.

Cycling team 
Louis Garneau operated a cycling development team for several years, in order to help young talented cyclists reach their full potential and allow them to pass into the ranks of professional cyclists. Some big name Quebec cyclists who went through this development team are: David Veilleux (first Quebec cyclist to participate in the Tour de France within the professional continental team Europcar), Antoine Duchesne (who joined Europcar in 2014 and is now part of Groupama FDJ), Hugo Houle (a member of the UCI World Tour AG2R La Mondiale team from 2013 and now with Astana-Premier Tech), as well as Canadian Michael Woods (who will start his 2021 season within the UCI World Tour Israel Start-Up Nation cycling team.)

Through conferences and cycling events, Louis Garneau is socially involved with the organization Les Petits Frères, whose committed to relieving isolation and loneliness among the elderly.

On December 22, 2018, Garneau launched the international "Don't Text and Drive" day, in memory of his cycling friend Jason Lowndes, who died on his bike during a training session in Australia,  by a distracted driver, on December 22, 2017.

Top honours as a cyclist 
 1975
 First place at Canadian Junior Team Championship
 1976
 Provincial Junior Champion
 1977
 Track Cycling Canada Championships | Team Pursuit Canada Championship
 1978
 Track Cycling Canada Championships | Canadian Champion in Individual Pursuit
 Quebec Team Pursuit Championship
 1979
 Canadian Road Cycling Championships | Canadian Time Trial Champion
 Grand Prix Cycliste de Montréal
 Marc Blouin Grand Prix
 Grand Prix de Sutton
 Critérium de Verdun
 1980
 Maine International Bicycle Race
 Vancouver Criterium
 Canada Week Grand Prix
 1981
 Grand Prix de Lévis
 Tour de la Gaspésie
 Grand Prix cycliste de Beauport
 Sherbrooke Award
 Canada Week Awards
 Price Italian Super Prestige
 Grand Prix Terre des Hommes
 Critérium de Contrecœur
 1982
 Canada Week Awards
 Provincial Road Championship
 1983
 Fitchburg Longsjo Classic
 Ocean Gate Tower
 Hartford Criterium
 Lebanon Grand Prix

He competed in the individual road race event at the 1984 Summer Olympics.

Honours 
 1990 – Raymond-Blais Medal
 1997 – Chevalier de l'Ordre national du Québec
 1999 – Officer of the Order of Canada
 2007 – Honorary Doctorate from the University of Ottawa
2012 – Queen Elizabeth II's Diamond Jubilee Medal
 2014 – Recipient of the Medal of Honour of the Quebec National Assembly
 2015 – Recipient of one of 50 Canadian flags awarded by the Prime Minister to 50 deserving Canadians on the occasion of the 150th anniversary of the Maple Leaf

References

External links
Louis Garneau's website
BBC article about the photograph of Garneau and the Queen

1958 births
Living people
Canadian male cyclists
Cyclists at the 1984 Summer Olympics
French Quebecers
Knights of the National Order of Quebec
Officers of the Order of Canada
Olympic cyclists of Canada
Cyclists at the 1982 Commonwealth Games
Commonwealth Games competitors for Canada
Cyclists from Quebec City